The 2023 Cork Premier Intermediate Hurling Championship is scheduled to be the 20th staging of the Cork Premier Intermediate Hurling Championship since its establishment by the Cork County Board in 2004. The draw for the group stage placings took place on 11 December 2022. The championship is scheduled to run from July to October 2023.

Team changes

To Championship

Relegated from the Cork Senior A Hurling Championship
 Ballymartle

Promoted from the Cork Intermediate A Hurling Championship
 Dungourney

From Championship

Promoted to the Cork Senior A Hurling Championship
 Inniscarra

Relegated to the Cork Intermediate A Hurling Championship
 Youghal

Group A

Group A table

Group B

Group B table

Group C

Group C table

Knockout stage

Relegation playoff

Quarter-finals

Semi-finals

Final

References

External links
 Cork GAA website

Cork Premier Intermediate Hurling Championship
Cork Premier Intermediate Hurling Championship
Cork Premier Intermediate Hurling Championship